The Shenyang WS-10, codename Taihang, is a turbofan engine designed and built by the People's Republic of China.

Chinese media reported 266 engines were manufactured from 2010 to 2012 for the J-11 program. Unofficial estimates placed production at more than 300 units by May 2015.

Description
The WS-10A is advertised as an engine with  thrust. It has full authority digital engine control (FADEC).

Development
The WS-10 is derived from the CFM56 with the experience gained from the Woshan WS-6 turbofan project, which was abandoned at the start of the 1980s. The WS-10 project was reportedly started by Deng Xiaoping in 1986 to produce an engine comparable to the Saturn AL-31. The work was given to the Shenyang Aeroengine Research Institute (606 Institute) of the Aviation Industry Corporation of China (AVIC). Initial production models suffered quality issues from the early direct use of AL-31 control systems. Furthermore, Salyut refused to sell source code of the full authority digital engine control (FADEC) system, forcing China to spend nearly 20 years developing its own code independently. An early version of the FADEC flew on an J-8II in 2002. 

In 2004, Russian sources familiar with project reported problems meeting the thrust target; in 2005, they reported problems reducing the weight of the primary and secondary compressors, in addition to problems meeting thrust requirements. Engine testing on the J-11 had already started by 2004, and testing using one engine on the J-11 may have occurred as early as 2002.

A full-scale WS-10A engine was first seen at the 2008 China International Aviation & Aerospace Exhibition.

In 2009, Western media claim that the WS-10A approached the performance of the AL-31, but took much longer than the AL-31 to develop thrust. Furthermore, the engine reportedly only generated  of thrust. In April 2009, Lin Zuoming, head of AVIC, reported that the engine's quality was unsatisfactory. In 2010, it was reported that reliability was also poor; the WS-10A lasted only 30 hours, while the AL-31 needed refurbishing after 400 hours. The quality problems encountered with the WS-10A reflected the state of the Chinese aerospace industry. AVIC initiated a general effort to improve quality control throughout its production chain in 2011.

The WS-10A reportedly matured enough after 2009 to power the J-11B Block 02 aircraft. Production or performance issues may have prevented the WS-10A from powering the J-10B. In 2018, Chinese state media reported an increase in engine lifespan from 800 to 1,500 hours due to the increased heat resistance of new third-generation single-crystal turbine blades.

In March 2020, Chinese state media released a video showing a WS-10B-powered J-10C; aircraft markings suggest it was part of the fourth batch of J-10Cs for the PLAAF.

The WS-10 has also powered various versions of the Chengdu J-20. The WS-10B reportedly powered low rate initial production aircraft in 2015, and was used as an interim engine before the adoption of the AL-31. In 2019, the Xian WS-15 – the J-20's intended engine – failed trials, leading to the decision to replace the AL-31 with the WS-10C as the interim engine; reportedly, the AL-31 was unacceptable because Russia refused to sell additional engines unless China also bought the Sukhoi Su-35 as well. Testing was underway by November 2020. In June 2021, Chinese media confirmed that the WS-10C was powering operational J-20As. In January 2022, it was reported that J-20's powered by the WS-10C would be upgraded with TVC.

In November 2022, a production Shenyang J-15 powered by the WS-10, possible the WS-10B, appeared in Chinese media. It was the last indigenous Chinese combat aircraft to replace the AL-31; possibly due to navalisation. According to Chinese observers, compared to the AL-31 the WS-10 had superior safety, reliability, and service life, aspects which are magnified by the constraints of carrier aviation. The replacement reflected continuing improvements in China's aviation engine industry.

WS-20 (WS-188)

The Shenyang WS-20 (WS-188) is a high-bypass engine, reportedly producing 13.8 tons of thrust. It is believed to be based on the core of the WS-10A.

The Shenyang WS-20 is believed to be intended for the Y-20 strategic airlifter.

Thrust vectoring
A testbed J-10B powered by a WS-10 with thrust vectoring (TVC) – called "WS-10B-3" by Jamie Hunter – was demonstrated at the 2018 China International Aviation & Aerospace Exhibition. The TVC nozzle uses actuator-assisted moving petals, similar in concept to General Electric's axisymmetric vectoring exhaust nozzle (AVEN) and Pratt & Whitney's pitch-yaw balance beam nozzle (PYBBN).

Variants
 WS-10 – base variant
 WS-10A – improved variant with FADEC; advertised to have  thrust.
 WS-10H – Naval variant equipped on two Shenyang J-15 prototypes. Limited to testing.
 WS-10B-3 – TVC variant
 WS-10G – thrust vectoring variant generating  of thrust during testing; intended for the Chengdu J-20
 WS-20 – high-bypass derivative for the Y-20 transport;  of thrust
 QD70 – 7MW class gas turbine engine developed from WS-10 for industrial & naval applications

Applications

WS-10
Shenyang J-8II (test)

WS-10A
Chengdu J-10B (test)
Shenyang J-11B
Shenyang J-15 
Shenyang J-16

WS-10B
Chengdu J-10C
Shenyang J-16
Chengdu J-20 (low rate initial production aircraft)
WS-10B-3
Chengdu J-10B (demonstrator)
Chengdu J-20B (prototype)

WS-10C
Chengdu J-20A (2019–present)

Specifications (WS-10A)

See also

References

Bibliography

 

1990s turbofan engines
Low-bypass turbofan engines